Matong  is a town in the central east part of the Riverina region of New South Wales, Australia. At the 2016 census, Matong had a population of 164 people.

Sport
The most popular sport in Matong is Australian rules football, as it lies in the narrow 'canola belt', a geographical triangle stretching from the Grong Grong and Marrar at either end of the Canola Way, to Ungarie, in which Australian football retains a strong following, despite New South Wales being a largely rugby league supporting state.

Gallery

Notes and references

Towns in the Riverina
Towns in New South Wales
Coolamon Shire
Matong, New South Wales